Now I Know is a daily email newsletter about trivia written by Dan Lewis. Described as "a newer, less snarky iteration of Cecil Adams’ The Straight Dope," it has been running since 2010 with over 100,000 subscribers as of 2018. The newsletter won a Webby Award for email newsletters in 2013 and 2014. Lewis credits his success to his engagement with his community, claiming he replies to nearly every email sent to him. He also notes his Jewish background saying "[T]here's an oral tradition in Judaism to explain and analyze things" which is the general theme of his newsletter which uses seemingly obscure facts to tell a bigger story.

The newsletter has been turned into two books, Now I Know: The Revealing Stories Behind the World’s Most Interesting Facts and Now I Know More: The Revealing Stories Behind Even More of the World's Most Interesting Facts. The newsletter is also being expanded to a YouTube series featuring Matt Silverman.

Lewis is a lawyer and co-founder of ArmchairGM, which was purchased by Wikia. He was an early blogger and is currently the Senior Director of Digital Marketing at Sesame Workshop where he used to tweet for Big Bird and started most of Sesame Street's social media accounts. Lewis was also the Connecticut State Magic the Gathering Champion in 1997.

References

External links
 Official Website
 Dan Lewis home page

Newsletters
Trivia